Juan Manuel Lopez vs Rafael Marquez had a boxing match. Juan Manuel Lopez was the WBO's featherweight champion and is from Puerto Rico, and Rafael Marquez is from Mexico. The fight was highly anticipated due to the history of competition between Mexican boxers and those from Puerto Rico.

The match between Juan Manuel Lopez and Rafael Marquez took place on November 6, 2010 in Las Vegas, Nevada. Lopez was able to retain his world title by winning with an eighth round technical knockout.

The fight between Juan Manuel Lopez and Rafael Marquez was originally scheduled for September 18th, but was postponed due to an injury Marquez sustained on his right thumb. The fight was rescheduled for November 6th, which was Lopez's second defense of his WBO title and was broadcast on Showtime.

The fight 
Marquez lost the fight in the 8th round by TKO after he was unable to continue due to a shoulder injury. Marquez had chosen to proceed with the bout even though he suffered with a right shoulder injury before the contest because he did not wish to cause a second delay. It was later revealed that Marquez had suffered a hairline fracture in his right shoulder blade during the fight and would require six months to recover from the injury. Despite the loss, Marquez expressed his eagerness to face Lopez in a rematch.

Televised
Featherweight bout:  Juan Manuel Lopez vs.  Rafael Márquez
Lopez defeated Marquez via technical knockout in the eighth round. Marquez was unable to continue following the eighth round citing a shoulder injury.
Super Middleweight bout:  Allan Green vs.  Glen Johnson
Johnson defeats Green via knockout in the eighth round.

Untelevised
Lightweight bout:  Marvin Quintero vs.  Daniel Attah
Attah defeated Quintero via knockout in the second round.
Super Featherweight bout:  Diego Magdaleno vs.  Derrick Campos
Magdaleno defeated Campos via technical knockout in the fourth round.
Lightweight bout:  Mickey Bey vs.  Eric Cruz
Bey Jr defeated Cruz via unanimous decision (60-53, 59-53, 59-53).
Flyweight bout:  McWilliams Arroyo vs.  Cesar Grajeda
Arroyo defeated Grajeda via technical knockout in the first round.
Light Welterweight bout:  Dany Escobar vs.  Anthony Lenk
Lenk defeated Escobar via unanimous decision. 
Featherweight bout:  Jesus Magdaleno vs.  Matthew Salazar
Magdaleno defeated Salazar via technical knockout in the first round. This was Magdaleno's professional debut.

International broadcast

''ABS-CBN is the official television network of the entry to the ABS-CBN Sports presents Top Rank boxing series.

References

Boxing matches
2010 in boxing
Boxing in Las Vegas
2010 in sports in Nevada
November 2010 sports events in the United States
MGM Grand Garden Arena